Pushmataha Wildlife Management Area is a scientifically managed preserve of native flora and fauna in northern Pushmataha County, Oklahoma, five miles (8 km) south of Clayton, Oklahoma. It is managed by the Oklahoma Department of Wildlife Conservation.

Its predominant characteristics are a mixture of oak/pine forest with steep slopes, shallow soils and rocky terrain.

Scientific management of native habitats is pursued in earnest in the WMA, which is home to one of the longest-running multi-year research projects in southeastern Oklahoma.  Spanning almost 30 years is a research project examining the response of vegetation to fire frequency.  The project occupies  of the  area, and is called the Pushmataha Forest Habitat Research Demonstration Area.

Burnings take place as well to improve the timber stand and produce native wildlife foods, another area of study.

History
The WMA dates from 1947, when the State of Oklahoma purchased and established it as a deer preserve.  At the time, the state's deer herd had been overhunted and had dropped to less than 500 animals.  The state wildlife department nurtured a herd of native deer in the WMA and began exporting it to other parts of Oklahoma.  The effort was very successful, and controlled hunts were allowed in its territory by the 1960s.

Today the deer herd in the WMA is at a buck-to-deer ratio of 1:2.5.

Elk has been reintroduced to the WMA, beginning in 1969. A total of 72 head of elk were captured at the Wichita Mountains Wildlife Refuge and brought to the Pushmataha WMA. By 2000 the herd had prospered--today it numbers approximately 40 animals--but its genetic diversity had suffered, causing an additional eight head of elk to be imported.

Plants
Over 450 varieties of native plants have been cataloged in the WMA. Tree species include shortleaf pine, post oak, red oak, black oak, hickory, elm, blackgum, sweetgum, rusty blackhaw (Viburnum rufidulum), flowering dogwood, and hawthorn (Crataegus).  There is also an abundance of high bush huckleberry, low bush huckleberry, different types of sumac, coralberry, poison ivy, greenbrier, blackberry and others.

Animals
Among the game species found in the WMA are whitetail deer, bobwhite quail, eastern wild turkeys, cottontail rabbits, coyote, bobcat, opossum, skunk, raccoon, dove, wood duck, mallards, woodcock, fox squirrel, and game squirrel.

Nongame species include Bachman's sparrow, brown creeper, owls, particularly screech owls, and eastern wood pewee.

Approximately  of rain fall per year in the WMA.

See also
List of Oklahoma Wildlife Management Areas

References 

 

Wildlife sanctuaries of the United States
Protected areas of Oklahoma
Protected areas of Pushmataha County, Oklahoma
Protected areas established in 1947
1947 establishments in Oklahoma